The Speaker of the Hellenic Parliament is the presiding officer of the Parliament of Greece. The president's term coincides with the term of the assembly, and is chosen by a vote during the opening session, after each legislative election. Following is a list of speakers of the Hellenic Parliament or other national legislative bodies such as the Greek Senate, from the time of the Greek War of Independence till present. The official order of precedence ranks the speaker of the Hellenic Parliament in the 3rd position, after the President of the Republic and the Prime Minister.

The incumbent speaker is Konstantinos Tasoulas of New Democracy.

Constitutional powers
According to the Constitution of Greece, in the event of a temporary absence of the president of the Hellenic Republic on account of illness, travel abroad or similar circumstances, the speaker of the parliament serves as acting president, and exercises the powers of the state president until the president resumes his functions, and in the event that the presidency falls vacant as a result of death or resignation or for any other reason, until the election of a new president.

List of speakers

Provisional government of the War of Independence, 1821–1827 
This includes the presidents of the various Greek National Assemblies and the Legislative Corps (Βουλευτικό) during the Greek War of Independence.

Note: all dates are Old Style

First Hellenic Republic, 1827–1832 
This includes the presidents of the National Assemblies and the various legislative bodies under Governor Ioannis Kapodistrias and his successors.

Note: all dates are Old Style

Presidents of the National Assemblies and the Parliament (Βουλή)

Presidents of the Senate (Γερουσία)

Reign of King Otto, 1843–1862
When King Otto arrived in Greece, he was still a minor, and until 1835 the country was governed by a regency council. The regents ignored the so-called "" voted by the Fifth National Assembly, and when Otto assumed full powers, he ruled as an absolute monarch. The only "parliamentary" body was the 20-member Council of State (Συμβούλιο της Επικρατείας), but its role was purely consultative and it was strictly controlled by the King.

The new constitution provided for a constitutional monarchy with a bicameral parliament composed of the Senate (Γερουσία) and the Parliament (Βουλή).

Presidents of the Parliament
The Parliament was to have no less than 80 members (in practice the number was between 127 and 142) with a three-year tenure (in practice some 2,5 years).

Note: all dates are Old Style

Presidents of the Senate
The Senate had a minimum of 27 members and could reach 39. Senators had to be over 40 years old, were named by the King and served for life. As a clearly monarchical instrument, it was abolished after 1862.

Note: all dates are Old Style

First period of the Constitutional monarchy, 1863–1924
The Assembly thereafter promulgated the Constitution of 1864 and dissolved itself on 16 November 1864. The new constitution was liberal, established the principle of popular sovereignty and defined the country's new form of government as a Constitutional monarchy with parliamentary democracy (βασιλευομένη δημοκρατία), but retained considerable executive powers for the king. The Senate was abolished, and a unicameral parliament (Βουλή) of 181 members with a four-year term was proclaimed as the country's sole legislative body.

The first decade was marked by frequent changes of government, especially due to the king's interference. A landmark was the adoption of the "dedilomeni  principle", championed by Charilaos Trikoupis, in 1875, which forced the king to appoint only governments that commanded a parliamentary majority and had the "declared (dedilomeni) confidence of the parliament". The 1880s and 1890s were also marked by political instability. The Goudi coup of 1909 resulted in the arrival of Eleftherios Venizelos and the August 1910 elections for a Revisoniary Parliament. New elections for a new Revisoniary Parliament were held in November, and the Constitution of 1911 was promulgated in June 1911. Political upheaval in the form of the National Schism dominated Greek politics from 1915 on, resulting in the Asia Minor Disaster and the abolition of the monarchy in 1924.

Note: all dates are Old Style

Second Hellenic Republic, 1924–1935
The , resulting from the December 1923 elections, declared the abolition of the monarchy and constituted itself as the Fourth Constitutional Assembly on 25 March 1924. It was abolished on 30 September 1925 after the coup d'état led by Theodoros Pangalos on 26 June 1925, and the first regular parliament of the Second Hellenic Republic came about only after Pangalos' fall, with the 1926 elections. The new parliament voted the Constitution of 1927, which also re-established the Senate, for which the first elections were held in 1929.

Presidents of the Parliament

Presidents of the Senate

Second period of the Constitutional monarchy, 1946–1967
This includes the post-World War II period up to the establishment of the Greek military junta of 1967–1974.

Third Hellenic Republic, 1974 to the present
The fall of the junta brought about a major regime change (metapolitefsi), which included the abolition of the monarchy by referendum. The strong two-party system of PASOK and New Democracy made the parliamentary life of the Third Hellenic Republic the most regular in Greek political history, with the exception of the 1989–90 political crisis. After 2011, the prevailing political system was shattered through the effects of the prolonged Greek debt crisis, leading to the marginalization of PASOK and the election, for the first time, of a left-wing party, the Coalition of the Radical Left, to power in the January 2015 elections.

See also
History of modern Greece
Politics of Greece

Sources

 

Speakers of the Hellenic Parliament
Lists of legislative speakers

Lists of political office-holders in Greece
1821 establishments in Greece